Kishore Kumar G (born 14 August 1974), known mononymously as Kishore, is an Indian actor who appears predominantly in Kannada, Tamil, Malayalam and Telugu films. He gained popularity for portraying the character of Veerappan in the Kannada film Attahasa in 2013. Recently, he got pan India recognition for his performance in The Family Man (Indian TV series), Ponniyin Selvan: I and Kantara (film).

Early life and education
Kishore was born on 14 August 1974 in Channapatna, a town in the southern part of India's Karnataka State. His father was a professor and mother, a homemaker. Kishore completed a major part of his schooling in Kunigal, Karnataka, and college education in National College, Bangalore. This was where he started off with theatre doing plays in Kannada such as Teregalu and Samrata Ashoka. He then did his master's degree in Kannada literature from Bangalore University. He took up teaching in a college in Bangalore where he worked for two years and then as an assistant to fashion designer Vidyasagar, a professor from National Institute of Fashion Technology (NIFT). His uncle was cultural critic D. R. Nagaraj. He is married to his college sweetheart Vishalakshi. During this time, he worked as a salesman for newspapers Deccan Herald and Prajavani.

Acting career

Kishore made his film debut in the 2004 Kannada film Kanti, acting as Byaadara Beera. He got a role in the film after having been identified initially to design costumes for the film and eventually went on to win a State award for his role in it. For his role in the film Raakshasa, he won the Karnataka State Award for Best Supporting Actor. He played a tough elder brother of heroines in Akash and Kallarali Hoovagi. He was approached by director Vetrimaaran to work in Desiya Nedunchalai, as he was looking for an actor who could speak Tamil with a Kannada accent. The film was dropped, but he got a chance to act in Polladhavan. The film was a major success at the box office. His other roles include a no non-sense cop in Duniya, a Kabaddi coach in Vennila Kabadi Kuzhu and a forest brigand Veerappan in the 2013 film Attahasa. In the same year, he appeared in a low-budget film Jatta in which played the role of a forest guard. In 2013 he was also in the Tamil films Haridas as a police officer raising his autistic kid and makes him an athlete and Arrambam (2013) where he also played a cop.

In 2014, he appeared in Ulidavaru Kandanthe, playing the role of Munna, another role that won him praise from critics.

In 2015, Kishore got his Tamil movie Thilagar released. Kishore's acting in the movie was praised by critics though the movie was not very successful at the box office.
In Echcharikkai (2018), Kishore plays the role of a crook who kidnaps a girl for money along with a fellow crook. He later acted in famous web series "The Family Man Season 1", where he played the role of commando who fights against terrorists.

After brief appearances in several movies and series, Kishore had a fantastic 2022 with 2 big releases on the same date. Kantara, which became the highest rated Indian film and the third highest grossing Kannada film behind the KGF series. Ponniyin Selvan: I, the other blockbuster movie where he played the antagonist, Ravidhasan. PS1 grossed more than 500 crores at the box office.

Filmography

Film

Webseries

References

External links

Living people
1974 births
Place of birth missing (living people)
21st-century Indian male actors
Indian male film actors
Male actors from Bangalore
Male actors in Kannada cinema
Male actors in Malayalam cinema
Male actors in Tamil cinema
Male actors in Telugu cinema